Zaviyeh (also Romanized as Zāvīyeh and Zāveyeh) is a village in Charuymaq-e Shomalesharqi Rural District, in the Central District of Hashtrud County, East Azerbaijan Province, Iran. At the 2006 census, its population was 70, in 18 families.

References 

Towns and villages in Hashtrud County